IIO or Iio may refer to:

iiO, an American dance music group
Iio (surname), in Japan
Imperial Inspectorate Organization, or its successor the Islamic Inspectorate Organization in Iran
Independent Investigations Office, a police oversight agency in British Columbia, Canada
 Italian Instabile Orchestra, an experimental big band
 Information Integration Officers, of the U.S. Air Force; see Aircrew Badge 
 Diminished supertonic triad (iio), a borrowed chord
 Linux Industrial I/O subsystem

See also
 I2O (Intelligent Input/Output), a defunct computer input/output (I/O) specification